The Mirae Party is a youth-oriented political party centered on the rising generation of South Korea. They criticize the nation's major political parties for not properly representing the voices of young people, citing youth politics as their main ideology.

The party initially used the name Our Future, but changed it to its current name on 17 February 2020.

Political orientation 

The party is putting forward "living politics" for women and young people and calling for active improvement in the educational and labor environment of young people, as well as ensuring the youth's "right to play". The party also calls for granting voting rights from the age of 16, and passive suffrage from the age of 20. In addition, Mirae Party is active in promoting LGBT rights.

External political exchanges 
Our Future has exchanged with Taiwan's New Power Party on various political issues, including youth issues.

See also 
 Age of candidacy
 Voting age
 Youth activism
 Youth empowerment
 Youth suffrage
 Youth voice

References 

2017 establishments in South Korea
Political parties established in 2017
Progressive parties in South Korea
LGBT political advocacy groups in South Korea
Youth politics in South Korea
Youth rights in South Korea